Promachoteuthis sulcus is a species of promachoteuthid squid. It is distinguished from related taxa on the basis of several morphological features: Nuchal fusion between the head and mantle, much larger size of arm-suckers compared to club-suckers, greater width of tentacle-base than arm-base, a recessed club-base, and the presence of an aboral tentacle-groove.

References

External links
Tree of Life web project: Promachoteuthis sulcus

Squid
Molluscs described in 2007